Rumsey Hall was an historic academic building at 12 Bolton Hill Road in Cornwall, Connecticut.  Built in 1848, it was a distinguished example of Greek Revival architecture that served as home to a number of academic institutions, including the first campus of the Rumsey Hall School.  It was listed on the National Register of Historic Places in 1990, and was demolished in 2010.

Description and history
The Rumsey Hall building stood on the west side of the village of Cornwall, on the north side of Bolton Hill Road just west of the Congregational church.  It was a 2-1/2 story wood frame structure, with a cruciform plan, covered by a gabled roof and finished in wooden clapboards.  Its front facade consisted of a six-column Greek Revival temple front, the columns rising to an entablature that encircled the building, with a fully pedimented gable above.  The gable had a rectangular multipane window at its center.  The building corners were pilastered.

The building was erected in 1848 to house a boarding school called the Alger Institute, which was one of a number of such schools established in the region after the Housatonic Railroad began service in 1842.  The school only survived until 1851, and was converted for use as a boarding house for summer visitors in 1884.  It was converted back to academic use in 1886, but none of its occupants were long-lived.  In 1907 the Rumsey Hall School moved into the premises from Seneca Falls, New York, and operated here until 1949.  It was purchased by a neighboring landowner in 1855, and bequested to the town in 1986, which made plans to adapt the building for use as its town hall.  The building was demolished in 2010.

See also
National Register of Historic Places listings in Litchfield County, Connecticut

References

University and college buildings on the National Register of Historic Places in Connecticut
Greek Revival architecture in Connecticut
Buildings and structures completed in 1848
Buildings and structures in Litchfield County, Connecticut
National Register of Historic Places in Litchfield County, Connecticut
Cornwall, Connecticut